Wat Nawamintararachutis is a working Thai Theravada Buddhist temple or "wat" in Raynham, Massachusetts, which is about 45 minutes south of Boston, Massachusetts, USA.  It is one of only a handful of Thai Buddhist temples in the United States with actual Thai Buddhist monks in residence.  Constructed on  previously occupied by a farm, it opened its doors to the public in June 2014. It is one of two Thai temples in Massachusetts; the other one is Wat Boston Buddha Vararam.

History
The ground breaking ceremony for the temple took place on 5–6 May 2011.  Construction was scheduled to start late June – July 2011.  The 110,000 square-foot temple was opened to the public in June 2014.

Description
The temple was designed by architect Been Z. Wang and features limestone from Jerusalem, concrete panels from Canada, Italian roofing tiles from Italy, and statues and light ornaments from Thailand. The temple can hold 700 people in the main worship space, and includes community rooms and lodging for monks and visitors, and a museum dedicated to King Bhumibol Adulyadej. A 4,000 lb statue of Buddha was placed in the building after completion.

The temple was named Wat Nawamin in honour of King Rama IX of Thailand, who was born on 5 December 1927 near Boston, in Cambridge, Massachusetts, USA (at the Mount Auburn Hospital).  At the time, the king's father lived in Brookline, Massachusetts and was a medical student at Harvard Medical School.

The temple is considered to be the largest Thai Buddhist meditation center outside Thailand.

See also
 Abhayagiri Buddhist Monastery, Redwood Valley, California
 San Fran Dhammaram Temple, San Francisco
 Vajiradhammapadip Temple, Centereach and Mount Vernon in New York
 Wat Boston Buddha Vararam, Bedford, Massachusetts
 Wat Buddhananachat of Austin, Del Valle, Texas
 Wat Buddhasamakeevanaram, Bossier City, Louisiana
 Wat Buddhanusorn, Fremont, California
 Wat Carolina Buddhajakra Vanaram, Bolivia, North Carolina
 Wat Florida Dhammaram, Kissimmee, Florida
 Wat Mettāvarānaṁ, Valley Center, California
 Wat Mongkolratanaram, Berkeley, California
 Wat Mongkolratanaram, Tampa, Florida
 Wat Pasantidhamma, Carrollton, Virginia
Buddhism in the United States

References

External links

Opening ceremonies photo album
Official blog
Official Website

Asian-American culture in Massachusetts
Buddhist temples in Massachusetts
Thai-American culture
Thai Theravada Buddhist temples and monasteries
Overseas Thai Buddhist temples
Buildings and structures in Bristol County, Massachusetts
Raynham, Massachusetts